Red Rocks may refer to:

Places 

 Red Rock Canyon National Conservation Area near Las Vegas, Nevada
 Red Rocks (SSSI), an area of sand dunes and reedbeds in England
 Red Rocks, Newfoundland and Labrador, Canada
 Red Rocks, Scotland, a small group of rocky islands in Loch Sunart
 Red Rocks Park in Jefferson County, Colorado
 Red Rocks Amphitheatre, an open-air concert venue in Red Rocks Park
 Pariwhero / Red Rocks, a rocky point and seal colony near Wellington, New Zealand

Other 

 Red Rocks (horse), 2006 Breeders' Cup winner
 Red Rocks Community College, Colorado
 Red Rocks Live: Neil Young, Friends & Relatives, a 2000 DVD/VHS video
 Utah Red Rocks, the University of Utah women's gymnastics team

See also
 
 Red Rock (disambiguation)